Bernd Helmschrot (born 18 March 1947) is a former German footballer. He played as a goalkeeper.

Helmschrot began his career with Hannover 96 and made his professional debut for the club in a 2-2 draw with Hamburger SV in the Bundesliga on 17 February 1968. He remained as Hannover's first-choice goalkeeper for the next nine months, but after losing his position due to injury, he struggled to re-establish himself in the starting line-up.  In 1968, he toured east Asia with the West Germany amateur international squad, making two appearances. He left Hannover in 1971 for TSV 1860 München, where he was managed by former West Germany international goalkeeper Hans Tilkowski.

Helmschrot went on to play for Kickers Offenbach, Olympia Wilhelmshaven, Viktoria Köln and Fortuna Köln, for whom he played in the 1983 final of the DFB cup, which his team lost 1-0 to local rivals 1. FC Köln. After retiring in 1987 he worked as an advertising manager.

References

1947 births
Living people
Association football goalkeepers
German footballers
Bundesliga players
2. Bundesliga players
Hannover 96 players
TSV 1860 Munich players
Kickers Offenbach players
FC Viktoria Köln players
SC Fortuna Köln players
Footballers from Hanover